The January 1910 United Kingdom general election was held from 15 January to 10 February 1910. The government called the election in the midst of a constitutional crisis caused by the rejection of the People's Budget by the Conservative-dominated House of Lords, in order to get a mandate to pass the budget.

The general election resulted in a hung parliament, with the Conservative Party led by Arthur Balfour and their Liberal Unionist allies receiving the most votes, but the Liberals led by H. H. Asquith winning the most seats, returning two more MPs than the Conservatives. Asquith's government remained in power with the support of the Irish Parliamentary Party, led by John Redmond. Another general election was soon held in December.

The Labour Party, led by Arthur Henderson, returned 40 MPs. Much of this apparent increase (from the 29 Labour MPs elected in 1906) came from the defection, a few years earlier, of Lib Lab MPs from the Liberal Party to Labour.

Results

|}

Voting summary

Seats summary

See also
List of MPs elected in the January 1910 United Kingdom general election
Parliamentary franchise in the United Kingdom 1885–1918
January 1910 United Kingdom general election in Ireland

References

External links
Spartacus: Political Parties and Election Results
United Kingdom election results—summary results 1885–1979

Manifestos
January 1910 Conservative manifesto
January 1910 Labour manifesto
January 1910 Liberal manifesto

 
General elections to the Parliament of the United Kingdom
General election
January 1910 events
February 1910 events
1910 elections in Ireland
1910 in British politics
H. H. Asquith